Lchkadzor is a village in the Noyemberyan Municipality of the Tavush Province of Armenia.

Gallery

References

External links 

Populated places in Tavush Province